The Chickasaw meridian begins on the north boundary of Mississippi in latitude 34° 59' north, longitude 89° 15' west from Greenwich, extends south to latitude 33° 48' 45" north, and governs the surveys in north Mississippi.

See also
List of principal and guide meridians and base lines of the United States

References

External links

Meridians and base lines of the United States
Named meridians
Geography of Mississippi